Abigail is a 2019 Russian steampunk fantasy adventure film directed by Aleksandr Boguslavsky, and co-produced by Viktor Denisyuk and Yevgeny Melentyev, the company KinoDanz. The film stars Tinatin Dalakishvili as Abigail Foster, with Gleb Bochkov, Rinal Mukhametov, Artyom Tkachenko, and Ravshana Kurkova.

Abigail was theatrically released in Russia on August 22, 2019, by 20th Century Fox CIS.

Plot
Abigail is a young girl living in a town which, many years earlier, experienced an epidemic of a mysterious illness and was subsequently sealed off from the outside world by the government. One of those who fell ill was Abby's father, taken away when she was six years old. While searching for her father, Abby finds out that the epidemic never actually occurred; it was all a huge deceit. In fact, she lives in a world of magic. Her city has been seized by users of dark magic, who wiped out all other sorcerers, banned magic, and attempted to erase all traces of its existence.

The epidemic was a cover employed to "cleanse" the city of Magic. For many years, the Special Department has continued to snatch anyone who appears to have magical powers, deeming them "infected." Most of the inhabitants have no idea that the city's rulers are not their protectors, but their prison wardens.

One day, Abby discovers that magical powers are stirring inside her. This scares her, but however hard she tries to suppress it the magic grows within her, and agents from the Special Department begin to hunt her down. She must flee from her home and begin a journey full of adventure and danger. This journey completely transforms her perceptions about magic and the world in which she lives.

Cast
 Tinatin Dalakishvili as Abigail Foster
  as Young Abigail 
 Eddie Marsan as Jonathan Foster
 Gleb Bochkov as Bale
 Rinal Mukhametov as Norman
 Artyom Tkachenko as William Garrett
 Ravshana Kurkova as Stella
 Ksenia Kutepova as Margaret Foster
 Olivier Siou as Spenser
 Cecile Plage as Lilian
 Nikita Tarasov as Ethan 
 Petar Zekavitsa as Roy
 Nikita Dyuvbanov as Marcus
 Ivan Chuykov as rebel Ryan

Production

Filming 
Shooting took place in Saint Petersburg, Gatchina, Moscow and in the historical part of Tallinn, Estonia. The images of the fantasy city were created on the basis of ancient buildings and narrow streets of Tallinn and Saint Petersburg, and finalized with the help of computer graphics.

Principal photography was completed in Tallinn, transformed into the streets of the fictional city Fensington, in which, according to the plot, fairy tale events take place.

Filmmakers of Abigail have developed an original conception of magic and a stylistics of closed fantastic city that combines steampunk and atmosphere of the early 20th century. There were created the unique images of the suits of city residents, rebels and their enemies – inspectors of the Security Division.

Post-production 
Visual effects were created by VFX-studio Kinodanz.

References

External links
 Official website
 

2019 films
2010s Russian-language films
2010s fantasy adventure films
Steampunk films
Russian fantasy adventure films
Films shot in Moscow
Films shot in Russia
2010s teen fantasy films
2010s English-language films
Films set in a fictional country
Fratricide in fiction
High fantasy films
Films about witchcraft
2010s dystopian films
Russian post-apocalyptic films
Russian dystopian films
Uxoricide in fiction
Films set in the future